Renaissance: The Masters Series, Part 9 is the ninth installment from the Masters Series from Renaissance Recordings mixed by Satoshi Tomiie. A competition was also created to give away signed copies from the compilation to promote Tomiie as an artist as well as the label itself. Other promotions included a world wide tour of Tommie and the Masters Series. The compilation was featured as number 6 in the "Textura 2007 TOP 20 Compilations/Mixes".

Track listing

Reviews

The album features a two disc electro house style by Satoshi Tomiie, his latest effort from mixing the 3D compilation on Renaissance aimed at music for home, club and studio; unlike other DJ Mixes the Masters Series are meant to be only for clubs. The first disc features a precise measured set that is as clean as the second disc is dark and moody. The discs contain a variety of strings with funked-up basslines creating a distinctly mellow feel. The cd can be easily compared to the style of Danny Howells, with a warm house feel and funky progressive sounds. The second is techier, more energetic and dance floor oriented, but definitely not trivial. The best tracks that confirm this are the fabulous remixes of ‘I Need’ and ‘It’s Your Time’, together with the last three numbers on the album. Disc two shows a darker view with more noise including artists like King Britt, DJ Yellow and D'Julz, as well as Radioslave, Aber, Shlomi and Jim Rivers. It also features Tomiie's Opus Ink co-production with Audiofly. The artwork on the front cover of the album shows a mysterious confusion and abstract nature of the music inside the cd. The disc has an energetic and dance floor oriented feel with tracks like "I Need" and "It's Your Time", including the closing tracks; Guy Gerber & Patrik K's "Sleeping In The Bass Box", Shlomi Aber which presents Bao with "Crop Duster" and Estroe's track "Driven".

References

DJ mix albums
2008 compilation albums